The 2022–23 Men's England Hockey League season is the 2022–23 season of England's field hockey league structure and England Hockey Men's Championship Cup. The season started on 24 September 2022.

Old Georgians were the defending league and cup champions. The Premier Division retained system of two phases; the first phase would consist of 10 matches per club and would be completed by the end of 2022, determining the top six clubs (irrespective of home and away advantage) for phase 2.

2022-23 teams

Premier Division

Division One South

Division One North

Current Tables

Premier Division

Division One South

Division One North

England Hockey Men's Championship Cup

Quarter-finals

Semi-finals

Final 
Lee Valley Hockey and Tennis Centre

Conference divisions
Below the top three divisions are four Conference divisions - Midlands, North, East and West.

Conference Midlands

Conference North

See also
2022–23 Women's England Hockey League season

References

2022-23
England
2022 in English sport
2023 in English sport